Clive Howard Morrison (5 July 1889 – 1 February 1960) was an Australian rules footballer who played with Fitzroy in the Victorian Football League (VFL).

Notes

External links 

1889 births
1960 deaths
Australian rules footballers from Melbourne
Fitzroy Football Club players
People educated at Scotch College, Melbourne
People from Box Hill, Victoria